Swarnim Gujarat Sports University (SGSU) is a state University located in Swarnim Gujarat Sports University, Opp. Taluka Seva Sadan Desar, Nr. Valavav Crossroad, At Post-Desar, Taluka - Desar, Pin - 391774  Vadodara district. It is a residential and affiliating university. It is second Sports University established by any State Government in India after Tamil Nadu Physical Education and Sports University.

Affiliated colleges

Grant-in-aid colleges
Shri C. P. Degree College of Physical Education
Degree College of Physical Education, Mahemdavad

Self-financed colleges
S.S. Patel College of Physical Education
V.J. Patel College of Physical Education
Shri K.K Dharaiya B.P.Ed. College
Dr. Subhash B.P.Ed. College
L.J. Institutes of Sports Management
L.J. Institutes of Event Management

References

Sports universities and colleges
Universities in Gujarat
Education in Gandhinagar
Educational institutions established in 2011
2011 establishments in Gujarat
Sport schools in India
Physical Education and Sports universities in India